Eduardo Hernández-Sonseca Lorenzo (born 21 June 1983) is a Spanish professional basketball player who plays for Basket Navarra of the LEB Plata.

Professional career
Hernández-Sonseca starts his career in the reserve team of Baloncesto, and he played with the whites until 2007, when he leaves the club for playing with DKV Joventut. After spending three seasons in Badalona, he continued playing at several clubs of the Liga ACB. On 25 September 2012 he signed a two-week deal with Caja Laboral after playing the entire pre-season with the team. He started the 2013–14 season with Afra Fars, a team in the Iranian Basketball Super League. On 26 January 2014 he signed with the Belgian team Kangoeroes Basket Willebroek.

Spain national team
Hernández-Sonseca played for the first time with the Spain national basketball team on 23 November 2003, in a game of the Qualification for the EuroBasket 2003 against Denmark, where Spain won by 87–43 at Arganda del Rey. Sonseca made 17 points and grabbed 9 rebounds, in the best performance for a newcomer in the Spanish squad.

Sonseca joined also the national team before the 2006 FIBA World Championship, but finally coach Hernández chose Marc Gasol instead of him for playing the tournament.

Trophies
Real Madrid
 Liga ACB: 2004–05
 ULEB Cup (2006–07
Joventut
 ULEB Cup: 2007–08
 Copa del Rey: 2008
Oviedo
 Copa Princesa de Asturias: 2017

References

External links
 Euroleague.net Profile

1983 births
Living people
Básquet Coruña players
Bilbao Basket players
CB Gran Canaria players
CB Valladolid players
Centers (basketball)
Joventut Badalona players
Kangoeroes Basket Mechelen players
Liga ACB players
Melilla Baloncesto players
Oviedo CB players
Real Madrid Baloncesto players
Saski Baskonia players
Spanish men's basketball players
Basket Navarra Club players